Spegazziniophytum is a plant genus of the family Euphorbiaceae first described as a genus in 2001. It contains only one known species, Spegazziniophytum patagonicum, endemic to Argentina (Provinces of Mendoza, Neuquén, Chubut, Santa Cruz).

References

Hippomaneae
Monotypic Euphorbiaceae genera
Endemic flora of Argentina